Ravenous may refer to:

Film
 Ravenous (1999 film), a horror film directed by Antonia Bird
 Ravenous (2017 film), a French-language Canadian horror film directed by Robin Aubert

Music

Albums 
 Ravenous  (God Dethroned album), 2000
 Ravenous (Wolf album), 2009
 Ravenous (soundtrack), from the 1999 film, by Damon Albarn and Michael Nyman

Other
 Ravenous, a German synthpop band associated with Funker Vogt
 The Ravenous, an American death metal band associated with Chris Reifert
 "Ravenous", a song by Atreyu from Congregation of the Damned
 "Ravenous", a song by Killswitch Engage from Atonement
 Ravenous Records, a British record label

Other media
 Ravenous (audio drama), based on the British television series Doctor Who
 The Ravenous, a 2003 horror novel by T. M. Gray